The Messerschmitt Bf 161 was a 1930s prototype German reconnaissance aircraft.

Development
The Bf 161 was a specialised reconnaissance aircraft, based on the Bf 110, and similar to the Bf 162, designed as a light bomber. The prototype V1 was powered by two Junkers Jumo 210 inline engines and first flew on 9 March 1938. It was followed by a second prototype, V2, powered by two Daimler-Benz DB 600a engines which first flew on 30 August 1938.

The aircraft did not enter production, as it was soon decided that a new aircraft type was not needed, and variants of the Bf 110 could perform the reconnaissance role.

Operational history
The two prototypes were used for research and development, and V2 was used in Augsburg for towing the Me 163A Komet, later moving to Peenemünde to continue towing.

Specifications (Bf 161 V1)

See also

References

External links
 German Aviation 1919 - 1945

Bf 161
1930s German military reconnaissance aircraft
Aircraft first flown in 1938
Twin piston-engined tractor aircraft
Twin-tail aircraft